The following is a list radio stations in Paraguay which can be sorted by their name, frequencies, city, or website, updated to date.

Asunción

Alto Paraguay

Alto Paraná

Amambay

Boquerón

Caaguazú

Caazapá

Canindeyú

Central

Concepción

Cordillera

Guairá

Itapúa

Misiones

Ñeembucú

Paraguarí

Presidente Hayes

San Pedro

References

 SICPY (Sistema Nacional de Información Cultural del Paraguay)
 Radios de Paraguay Aplicación
 Radios AM de Asunción
 Radio de Paraguay
 Radios en Paraguay
 Radios de Paraguay en Vivo
 Desde Paraguay
 RadioCut.fm

Paraguay
Radio stations
Radio stations in Paraguay